Charlotte Marguerite de Montmorency (11 May 1594 – 2 December 1650) was an heiress of one of France's leading ducal families, and Princess de Condé by her marriage to Henri de Bourbon. She almost became a mistress of Henry IV of France, but her husband escaped with her after the wedding and did not return to France until after King Henry's death.

Life
The daughter of Henri de Montmorency and his second wife, Louise de Budos,  Charlotte lost her mother before she was five years of age.  She was brought up under the care of her aunt Charlotte, widow of Charles, Duke d'Angoulême. 

In 1609, fifteen-year-old Charlotte-Marguerite wed the Prince of Condé in a glittering ceremony.

The king had arranged Charlotte's marriage to Condé for his own convenience, in order to sleep with her himself when he pleased. To escape from this predicament, the couple fled to Brussels. The king was enraged and threatened to march into Flanders with an army unless the Habsburg governors returned Condé and his wife at once. At the time, he was also threatening war with the Habsburgs over the succession to the United Duchies of Jülich-Cleves-Berg, so historians are unsure how crucial in itself Charlotte's return was as a reason for war. Condé continued to provoke Henry from Flanders. When asked to drink to the queen of France, he replied that there seemed to be more than one queen of France, maybe as many as four or five.

Along with many other French nobles, her husband bitterly opposed the rule of Marshal d'Ancre, who abandoned the policy of the late King Henry IV. In September 1616, Condé and Charlotte-Marguerite were arrested and imprisoned at Vincennes, where their daughter Anne Geneviève was conceived and born three years later, in 1619.

In 1632, Charlotte-Marguerite's only brother, Henri, Duke de Montmorency was executed for intriguing against Cardinal Richelieu. The title passed to her. She was buried at the Carmel du faubourg Saint-Jacques, a Carmelite convent in Paris.

Children

Her children with the Prince de Condé were:
 Anne Genevieve (1619-1679); married Henri d'Orléans, Duke de Longueville. 
 Louis, Prince of Condé, "le Grand Condé" (1621-1686); married Claire-Clémence de Maillé-Brézé.
 Armand de Bourbon, Prince of Conti (1629-1666); married Anne Marie Martinozzi.

Ancestry

See also

 List of Princesses of Condé

References

External links
 

Montmorency, Charlotte
Princesses of the Blood
Montmorency, Charlotte
Montmorency, Charlotte
Dukes of Montmorency
Princesses of Condé
House of Bourbon
Duchesses of Enghien
House of Montmorency
Burials at the Carmel du faubourg Saint-Jacques
Montmorency, Duchess of, Charlotte Marguerite
Peers created by Louis XIII
Household of Marie de' Medici